Acourtia thurberi, or Thurber's desertpeony, is a North American species of plant in the family Asteraceae. It is native to the Sonoran and Chihuahuan Desert regions in northern Mexico (Chihuahua, Sonora, Durango) and the southwestern United States (Arizona, New Mexico).

References

Flora of Arizona
Nassauvieae
Plants described in 1854
Flora of New Mexico
Flora of Chihuahua (state)
Flora of Durango
Flora of Sonora